Max Garlieb August Predöhl (29 March 1854 in Hamburg – 11 March 1923 in Hamburg) was a Hamburg lawyer and politician. He served as Senator and First Mayor of Hamburg (head of state and head of government).

The son of a Hamburg merchant, he obtained a doctorate in law in Leipzig in 1876, and worked as a barrister until 1893. He was also co-editor of the Handelsgerichtszeitung.

On 26 June 1893, the Hamburg Parliament elected him to the life-long seat in the Senate vacated with the death of Otto Wilhelm Mönckeberg, and 1910–1911, 1914 and 1917, he served as First Mayor and President of the Senate. He was also Second Mayor in 1913 and 1916.

His political career ended in 1919, following the constitutional changes that abolished the legal privileges of the grand burghers. Predöhl with the complete Senate of Hamburg, since 18 November 1918 as administration acting only, resigned on 27 March 1919. The Hamburg Parliament did not elect Predöhl into the next senate, unlike seven of his fellow senators. 

He was married to Clara Amsinck, and his mother-in-law was a member of the Gossler family; both families were among the most prominent in Hamburg. His wife's family connections greatly advanced his social position.

He was the father of the economist Andreas Predöhl, who became Rector of the University of Kiel.

Notes

References 

 Adolf Buehl, Aus der alten Ratsstube. Erinnerungen 1905-1918, Hamburg: Christians, 1971 (Verein für Hamburgische Geschichte (ed.), Heft 19), article on Predöhl, .
 Richard J. Evans, Tod in Hamburg: Stadt, Gesellschaft und Politik in den Cholera-Jahren 1830-1910, Reinbek bei Hamburg: Rowohlt, 1996, . (In dem Buch wird über einen Johann Predöhl gesprochen, vermutlich Fehler und identisch mit Max Predöhl, →Diskussion)
 Gerrit Schmidt, Die Geschichte der Hamburgischen Anwaltschaft von 1815 bis 1879, Hamburg: Mauke 1989,  (entry on Max Predöhl p. 372).
 Cornelius Wasmuth, Hanseatische Dynastien. Alte Hamburger Familien öffnen ihre Alben, Hamburg: Die Hanse, 2001, .
 Eberhard von Wiese, Hamburg: Menschen, Schicksale, Frankfurt M. / Berlin: Ullstein, 1967, pp. 34-38.

Mayors of Hamburg
Senators of Hamburg (before 1919)
Leipzig University alumni
1854 births
1923 deaths